In archaeology, cave paintings are a type of parietal art (which category also includes petroglyphs, or engravings), found on the wall or ceilings of caves. The term usually implies prehistoric origin, and the oldest known are more than 40,000 years old (art of the Upper Paleolithic) and found in the caves in the district of Maros (Sulawesi, Indonesia). The oldest are often constructed from hand stencils and simple geometric shapes. 
More recently, in 2021, cave art of a pig found in Sulawesi, Indonesia, and dated to over 45,500 years ago, has been reported.

A 2018 study claimed an age of 64,000 years for the oldest examples of non-figurative cave art in the Iberian Peninsula. Represented by three red non-figurative symbols found in the caves of Maltravieso, Ardales and La Pasiega, Spain, these predate the appearance of modern humans in Europe by at least 20,000 years and thus must have been made by Neanderthals rather than modern humans.

In November 2018, scientists reported the discovery of the then-oldest known figurative art painting, over 40,000 (perhaps as old as 52,000) years old, of an unknown animal, in the cave of Lubang Jeriji Saléh on the Indonesian island of Borneo. In December 2019, however, figurative cave paintings depicting pig hunting in the Maros-Pangkep karst in Sulawesi were estimated to be even older, at least 43,900 years old. The finding was noted to be "the oldest pictorial record of storytelling and the earliest figurative artwork in the world".

Dating

Nearly 350 caves have now been discovered in France and Spain that contain art from prehistoric times. Initially, the age of the paintings had been a contentious issue, since methods like radiocarbon dating can produce misleading results if contaminated by other samples, and caves and rocky overhangs (where parietal art is found) are typically littered with debris from many time periods. But subsequent technology has made it possible to date the paintings by sampling the pigment itself, torch marks on the walls, or the formation of carbonate deposits on top of the paintings. The subject matter can also indicate chronology: for instance, the reindeer depicted in the Spanish cave of Cueva de las Monedas places the drawings in the last Ice Age.

The oldest known cave painting is a red hand stencil in Maltravieso cave, Cáceres, Spain. It has been dated using the uranium-thorium method to older than 64,000 years and was made by a Neanderthal. The oldest date given to an animal cave painting is now a depiction of several human figures hunting pigs in the caves in the Maros-Pangkep karst of South Sulawesi, Indonesia, dated to be over 43,900 years old. Before this, the oldest known figurative cave paintings were that of a bull dated to 40,000 years, at Lubang Jeriji Saléh cave, East Kalimantan, Indonesian Borneo, and a depiction of a pig with a minimum age of 35,400 years at Timpuseng cave in Sulawesi.

The earliest known European figurative cave paintings are those of Chauvet Cave in France, dating to earlier than 30,000 BC in the Upper Paleolithic according to radiocarbon dating. Some researchers believe the drawings are too advanced for this era and question this age. However, more than 80 radiocarbon dates had been obtained by 2011, with samples taken from torch marks and from the paintings themselves, as well as from animal bones and charcoal found on the cave floor. The radiocarbon dates from these samples show that there were two periods of creation in Chauvet: 35,000 years ago and 30,000 years ago. One of the surprises was that many of the paintings were modified repeatedly over thousands of years, possibly explaining the confusion about finer paintings that seemed to date earlier than cruder ones. 

In 2009, cavers discovered drawings in Coliboaia Cave in Romania, stylistically comparable to those at Chauvet. An initial dating puts the age of an image in the same range as Chauvet: about 32,000 years old.

In Australia, cave paintings have been found on the Arnhem Land plateau showing megafauna which are thought to have been extinct for over 40,000 years, making this site another candidate for oldest known painting; however, the proposed age is dependent on the estimate of the extinction of the species seemingly depicted.  Another Australian site, Nawarla Gabarnmang, has charcoal drawings that have been radiocarbon-dated to 28,000 years, making it the oldest site in Australia and among the oldest in the world for which reliable date evidence has been obtained.

Other examples may date as late as the Early Bronze Age, but the well-known Magdalenian style seen at Lascaux in France (c.15,000 BC) and Altamira in Spain died out about 10,000BC, coinciding with the advent of the Neolithic period.  Some caves probably continued to be painted over a period of several thousands of years.

The next phase of surviving European prehistoric painting, the rock art of the Iberian Mediterranean Basin, was very different, concentrating on large assemblies of smaller and much less detailed figures, with at least as many humans as animals.  This was created roughly between 10,000 and 5,500 years ago, and painted in rock shelters under cliffs or shallow caves, in contrast to the recesses of deep caves used in the earlier (and much colder) period.  Although individual figures are less naturalistic, they are grouped in coherent grouped compositions to a much greater degree. Over a long period of time, the cave art has become less naturalistic and has graduated from beautiful, naturalistic animal drawings to simple ones, and then to abstract shapes.

Subjects, themes, and patterns in cave painting 

Cave artists use a variety of techniques such as finger tracing, modeling in clay, engravings, bas-relief sculpture, hand stencils, and paintings done in two or three colors. Scholars classify cave art as "Signs" or abstract marks. 
  The most common subjects in cave paintings are large wild animals, such as bison, horses, aurochs, and deer, and tracings of human hands as well as abstract patterns, called finger flutings. The species found most often were suitable for hunting by humans, but were not necessarily the actual typical prey found in associated deposits of bones; for example, the painters of Lascaux have mainly left reindeer bones, but this species does not appear at all in the cave paintings, where equine species are the most common.  Drawings of humans were rare and are usually schematic as opposed to the more detailed and naturalistic images of animal subjects. Kieran D. O'Hara, geologist, suggests in his book Cave Art and Climate Change that climate controlled the themes depicted.
Pigments used include red and yellow ochre, hematite, manganese oxide and charcoal. Sometimes the silhouette of the animal was incised in the rock first, and in some caves all or many of the images are only engraved in this fashion, taking them somewhat out of a strict definition of "cave painting".

Similarly, large animals are also the most common subjects in the many small carved and engraved bone or ivory (less often stone) pieces dating from the same periods.  But these include the group of Venus figurines, which with a few incomplete exceptions have no real equivalent in Paleolithic cave paintings. One counterexample is a feminine figure in the Chauvet Cave, as described in an interview with Dominique Baffier in Cave of Forgotten Dreams.
Hand stencils, formed by placing a hand against the wall and covering the surrounding area in pigment result in the characteristic image of a roughly round area of solid pigment with the uncoloured shape of the hand in the centre, these may then be decorated with dots, dashes, and patterns. Often, these are found in the same caves as other paintings, or may be the only form of painting in a location. Some walls contain many hand stencils.  Similar hands are also painted in the usual fashion. A number of hands show a finger wholly or partly missing, for which a number of explanations have been given. Hand images are found in similar forms in Europe, Eastern Asia, Australia, and South America.

Theories and interpretations 

In the early 20th century, following the work of Walter Baldwin Spencer and Francis James Gillen, scholars such as Salomon Reinach, Henri Breuil and  interpreted the paintings as 'utilitarian' hunting magic to increase the abundance of prey. Jacob Bronowski states, "I think that the power that we see expressed here for the first time is the power of anticipation: the forward-looking imagination. In these paintings the hunter was made familiar with dangers which he knew he had to face but to which he had not yet come."

Another theory, developed by David Lewis-Williams and broadly based on ethnographic studies of contemporary hunter-gatherer societies, is that the paintings were made by paleolithic shamans. The shaman would retreat into the darkness of the caves, enter into a trance state, then paint images of their visions, perhaps with some notion of drawing out power from the cave walls themselves.

R. Dale Guthrie, who has studied both highly artistic and lower quality art and figurines, identifies a wide range of skill and age among the artists. He hypothesizes that the main themes in the paintings and other artifacts (powerful beasts, risky hunting scenes and the representation of women in the Venus figurines) are the work of adolescent males, who constituted a large part of the human population at the time. However, in analyzing hand prints and stencils in French and Spanish caves, Dean Snow of Pennsylvania State University has proposed that a proportion of them, including those around the spotted horses in Pech Merle, were of female hands.

Analysis in 2022, led by Bennet Bacon, an amateur archaeologist, along with a team of professional archeologists and psychologists at the University of Durham, including Paul Pettitt and Robert William Kentridge, suggested that lines and dots (and a commonly seen, if unusual, "Y" symbol, which was proposed to mean "to give birth") on upper palaeolithic cave paintings correlated with the mating cycle of animals in a lunar calendar, potentially making them the earliest known evidence of a proto-writing system and explaining one object of many cave paintings.

Paleolithic cave art by region

Europe 

Well-known cave paintings include those of:
 Cave of El Castillo, Spain (~40.000 y.o.)
Kapova Cave, Bashkortostan, Russia (~36,000 y.o.)
 Chauvet Cave, near Vallon-Pont-d'Arc, France (~35,000 y.o.)
 Cave of La Pasiega, Cuevas de El Castillo, Cantabria, Spain (~30,000 y.o.?)
 Caves of Arcy-sur-Cure, France (~28,200 y.o.)
 Cosquer Cave, with an entrance below sea level near Marseille, France (~27,000 y.o.)
 Caves of Gargas, France (~27,000 y.o.)
 Grotte de Cussac, France (~25,000 y.o.)
 Pech Merle, near Cabrerets, France (25,000 y.o.)
 Lascaux, France (~17,000 y.o.)
 Cave of Niaux, France (~17,000 y.o.)
 Font-de-Gaume, in the Dordogne Valley, France (~17,000 y.o.)
 Badanj Cave, Stolac, Bosnia and Herzegovina (~16,000 y.o.)
 Cave of Altamira, near Santillana del Mar, Cantabria, Spain (~15,500 y.o.)
 La Marche, in Lussac-les-Châteaux,  France (~15,000 y.o.)
 Les Combarelles, in Les Eyzies de Tayac, Dordogne, France (~13,600 y.o.)
 Cave of the Trois-Frères, in Ariège, France (~13,000 y.o.)
 Magura Cave, Bulgaria (~10,000 y.o.)

Other sites include Creswell Crags, Nottinghamshire, England (~14,500 ys old cave etchings and bas-reliefs discovered in 2003), Peștera Coliboaia in Romania (~29,000 y.o. art?).

Rock painting was also performed on cliff faces; but fewer of those have survived because of erosion. One example is the rock paintings of Astuvansalmi (3000–2500 BC) in the Saimaa area of Finland.

When Marcelino Sanz de Sautuola first encountered the Magdalenian paintings of the Cave of Altamira in Cantabria, Spain in 1879, the academics of the time considered them hoaxes. Recent reappraisals and numerous additional discoveries have since demonstrated their authenticity, while at the same time stimulating interest in the artistry and symbolism of Upper Palaeolithic peoples.

East and Southeast Asia 

In Indonesia the caves in the district of Maros in Sulawesi are famous for their hand prints. About 1,500 negative handprints have also been found in 30 painted caves in the Sangkulirang area of Kalimantan; preliminary dating analysis as of 2005 put their age in the range of 10,000 years old. A 2014 study based on uranium–thorium dating dated a Maros hand stencil to a minimum age of 39,900 years. A painting of a babirusa was dated to at least 35.4 ka, placing it among the oldest known figurative depictions worldwide.

In November 2018, scientists reported the discovery of the oldest known figurative art painting, over 40,000 (perhaps as old as 52,000) years old, of an unknown animal, in the cave of Lubang Jeriji Saléh on the Indonesian island of Borneo.

And more recently, in 2021, archaeologists announced the discovery of cave art at least 45,500 years old in Leang Tedongnge cave, Indonesia. According to the journal Science Advances, the cave painting of a warty pig is the earliest evidence of human settlement of the region. It has been reported that it is rapidly deteriorating as a result of climate change in the region.

Originating in the Paleolithic period, the rock art found in Khoit Tsenkher Cave, Mongolia, includes symbols and animal forms painted from the walls up to the ceiling. Stags, buffalo, oxen, ibex, lions, Argali sheep, antelopes, camels, elephants, ostriches, and other animal pictorials are present, often forming a palimpsest of overlapping images. The paintings appear brown or red in color, and are stylistically similar to other Paleolithic rock art from around the world but are unlike any other examples in Mongolia.

The Padah-Lin Caves of Burma contain 11,000-year-old paintings and many rock tools.

India 

The Ambadevi rock shelters have the oldest cave paintings in India, dating back to 25,000 years. The Bhimbetka rock shelters are dated to about 8,000 BC. Similar paintings are found in other parts of India as well. In Tamil Nadu, ancient Paleolithic Cave paintings are found in Kombaikadu, Kilvalai, Settavarai and Nehanurpatti. In Odisha they are found in Yogimatha and Gudahandi. In Karnataka, these paintings are found in Hiregudda near Badami. The most recent painting, consisting of geometric figures, date to the medieval period.
Executed mainly in red and white with the occasional use of green and yellow, the paintings depict the lives and times of the people who lived in the caves, including scenes of childbirth, communal dancing and drinking, religious rites and burials, as well as indigenous animals.

Southern Africa
Cave paintings found at the Apollo 11 Cave in Namibia are estimated to date from approximately 25,500–27,500 years ago.

After extensive testing for seven years, it was revealed that the lines drawn on the rock were handmade and from an ochre crayon dating back 73,000 years. This makes it the oldest known rock painting.

Australia 

Significant early cave paintings, executed in ochre, have been found in Kimberley and Kakadu, Australia. Ochre is not an organic material, so carbon dating of these pictures is often impossible. The oldest so far dated at 17,300 years is an ochre painting of a kangaroo in the Kimberley region, which was dated by carbon dating wasp nest material underlying and overlying the painting.  Sometimes the approximate date, or at least, an epoch, can be surmised from the painting content, contextual artifacts, or organic material intentionally or inadvertently mixed with the inorganic ochre paint, including torch soot.

A red ochre painting, discovered at the centre of the Arnhem Land Plateau, depicts two emu-like birds with their necks outstretched. They have been identified by a palaeontologist as depicting the megafauna species Genyornis, giant birds thought to have become extinct more than 40,000 years ago; however, this evidence is inconclusive for dating.  It may suggest that Genyornis became extinct at a later date than previously determined.

Hook Island in the Whitsunday Islands is also home to a number of cave paintings created by the seafaring Ngaro people.

Holocene cave art

Asia
In the Philippines at Tabon Caves the oldest artwork may be a relief of a shark above the cave entrance. It was partially disfigured by a later jar burial scene.

The Edakkal Caves of Kerala, India, contain drawings that range over periods from the Neolithic as early as 5,000 BC to 1,000 BC.

Horn of Africa 

Rock art near Qohaito appears to indicate habitation in the area since the fifth millennium BC, while the town is known to have survived to the sixth century AD. Mount Emba Soira, Eritrea's highest mountain, lies near the site, as does a small successor village. Much of the rock art sites are found together with evidence of prehistoric stone tools, suggesting that the art could predate the widely presumed pastoralist and domestication events that occurred 5000– 4000 years ago.

In 2002, a French archaeological team discovered the Laas Geel cave paintings on the outskirts of Hargeisa in Somaliland. Dating back around 5,000 years, the paintings depict both wild animals and decorated cows. They also feature herders, who are believed to be the creators of the rock art. In 2008, Somali archaeologists announced the discovery of other cave paintings in Dhambalin region, which the researchers suggest includes one of the earliest known depictions of a hunter on horseback. The rock art is dated to 1000 to 3000 BC.

Additionally, between the towns of Las Khorey and El Ayo in Karinhegane is a site of numerous cave paintings of real and mythical animals. Each painting has an inscription below it, which collectively have been estimated to be around 2,500 years old. Karihegane's rock art is in the same distinctive style as the Laas Geel and Dhambalin cave paintings. Around 25 miles from Las Khorey is found Gelweita, another key rock art site.

In Djibouti, rock art of what appear to be antelopes and a giraffe are also found at Dorra and Balho.

North Africa 

Many cave paintings are found in the Tassili n'Ajjer mountains in southeast Algeria. A UNESCO World Heritage Site, the rock art was first discovered in 1933 and has since yielded 15,000 engravings and drawings that keep a record of the various animal migrations, climatic shifts, and change in human inhabitation patterns in this part of the Sahara from 6000 BC to the late classical period. Other cave paintings are also found at the Akakus, Mesak Settafet and Tadrart in Libya and other Sahara regions including: Ayr mountains, Niger and Tibesti, Chad.

The Cave of Swimmers and the Cave of Beasts in southwest Egypt, near the border with Libya, in the mountainous Gilf Kebir region of the Sahara Desert. The Cave of Swimmers was discovered in October 1933 by the Hungarian explorer László Almásy. The site contains rock painting images of people swimming, which are estimated to have been created 10,000 years ago during the time of the most recent Ice Age.

In 2020, limestone cave decorated with scenes of animals such as donkeys, camels, deer, mule and mountain goats was uncovered in the area of Wadi Al-Zulma by the archaeological mission from the Tourism and Antiquities Ministry. Rock art cave is 15 meters deep and 20 meters high.

Southern Africa 

At uKhahlamba / Drakensberg Park, South Africa, now thought to be some 3,000 years old, the paintings by the San people who settled in the area some 8,000 years ago depict animals and humans, and are thought to represent religious beliefs. Human figures are much more common in the rock art of Africa than in Europe.

North America 

Distinctive monochrome and polychrome cave paintings and murals exist in the mid-peninsula regions of southern Baja California and northern Baja California Sur, consisting of Pre-Columbian paintings of humans, land animals, sea creatures, and abstract designs. These paintings are mostly confined to the sierras of this region, but can also be found in outlying mesas and rock shelters. According to recent radiocarbon studies of the area, of materials recovered from archaeological deposits in the rock shelters and on materials in the paintings themselves, suggest that the Great Murals may have a time range extending as far back as 7,500 years ago.

Native artists in the Chumash tribes created cave paintings that are located in present-day Santa Barbara, Ventura, and San Luis Obispo Counties in Southern California in the United States. They include examples at Burro Flats Painted Cave and Chumash Painted Cave State Historic Park.

There are also Native American pictogram examples in caves of the Southwestern United States.  Cave art that is 6,000 years old was found in the Cumberland Plateau region of Tennessee.

South America 

Serra da Capivara National Park is a national park in the north east of Brazil with many prehistoric paintings; the park was created to protect the prehistoric artifacts and paintings found there. It became a World Heritage Site in 1991. Its best known archaeological site is Pedra Furada.

It is located in northeast state of Piauí, between latitudes 8° 26' 50" and 8° 54' 23" south and longitudes 42° 19' 47" and 42° 45' 51" west. It falls within the municipal areas of São Raimundo Nonato, São João do Piauí, Coronel José Dias and Canto do Buriti. It has an area of 1291.4 square kilometres (319,000 acres). The area has the largest concentration of prehistoric small farms on the American continents. Scientific studies confirm that the Capivara mountain range was densely populated in prehistoric periods.

Cueva de las Manos (Spanish for "Cave of the Hands") is a cave located in the province of Santa Cruz, Argentina, 163 km (101 mi) south of the town of Perito Moreno, within the borders of the Francisco P. Moreno National Park, which includes many sites of archaeological and paleontological importance.

The hand images are often negative (stencilled). Besides these there are also depictions of human beings, guanacos, rheas, felines and other animals, as well as geometric shapes, zigzag patterns, representations of the sun, and hunting scenes. Similar paintings, though in smaller numbers, can be found in nearby caves. There are also red dots on the ceilings, probably made by submerging their hunting bolas in ink, and then throwing them up. The colours of the paintings vary from red (made from hematite) to white, black or yellow. The negative hand impressions date to around 550 BC, the positive impressions from 180 BC, while the hunting drawings are calculated to more than 10,000 years old.  Most of the hands are left hands, which suggests that painters held the spraying pipe with their right hand.

Southeast Asia 

There are rock paintings in caves in Thailand, Malaysia, Indonesia, and Burma. In Thailand, caves and scarps along the Thai-Burmese border, in the Petchabun Range of Central Thailand, and overlooking the Mekong River in Nakorn Sawan Province, all contain galleries of rock paintings. In Malaysia, the Tambun rock art is dated at 2000 years, and those in the Painted Cave at Niah Caves National Park are 1200 years old. The anthropologist Ivor Hugh Norman Evans visited Malaysia in the early 1920s and found that some of the tribes (especially Negritos) were still producing cave paintings and had added depictions of modern objects including what are believed to be automobiles. (See prehistoric Malaysia.).
In Indonesia, the rock painting can be found in Kalimantan, Maluku, Papua, and Sulawesi. In 2018, Some rock paintings have been found on Lembata Island of Nusa Tenggara Timur.

See also 

 Art of the Upper Paleolithic
 List of Stone Age art
 Petroglyph
 Prehistoric art
 Rock art
 Proto-writing

Notes

References

Further reading

External links

Bradshaw Foundation The recording of cave paintings around the world
EuroPreArt database of European Prehistoric Art
American Rock Art Research Association
Tour of Afghan cave paintings from BBC News.
Le Kalimanthrope Rock art of Borneo (Kalimantan, Indonesia)
Journey through Art History, an outline of prehistoric art with emphasis on cave paintings from around the world.
Human Timeline (Interactive) – Smithsonian, National Museum of Natural History (August 2016).

Art of the Upper Paleolithic
 
Indigenous art
Mass media technology
Murals
Pre-Columbian art